Frances Claudet (April 11, 1911 – October 17, 2001) was a Canadian former pair skater. With partner Chauncey Bangs, she won the gold medal at the 1931 Canadian Figure Skating Championships and competed in the 1932 Winter Olympics, finishing sixth.

Results
ladies' singles

(with Chauncey Bangs)

Fours
(with Kathleen Lopdell, Melville Rogers, and Guy Owen)

References

1911 births
2001 deaths
Canadian female pair skaters
Figure skaters at the 1932 Winter Olympics
Olympic figure skaters of Canada